Baek Nam-chi (22 January 1944 – 4 May 2022) was a South Korean academic and politician. A member of the Reunification Democratic Party and the New Korea Party, he served in the National Assembly from 1988 to 2000. He died on 4 May 2022, at the age of 78.

References

1944 births
2022 deaths
People from South Chungcheong Province
Members of the National Assembly (South Korea)
Seoul National University alumni
New York University alumni
Columbia University alumni